Abbas Zeghayer is an Iraqi boxer. He competed in the men's light flyweight event at the 1984 Summer Olympics. At the 1984 Summer Olympics, he lost to William Bagonza of Uganda.

References

Year of birth missing (living people)
Living people
Iraqi male boxers
Olympic boxers of Iraq
Boxers at the 1984 Summer Olympics
Place of birth missing (living people)
Light-flyweight boxers